is a Japanese manga series created by Hokusei Katsushika, Naoki Urasawa, and Takashi Nagasaki. It was serialized in Big Comic Original from 1988 to 1994, with its 144 chapters collected into 18 tankōbon volumes by Shogakukan. In North America, Viz Media licensed the manga for English release.

An anime adaptation was created by Madhouse, with 24 episodes airing from 1998 to 1999 in Japan on Nippon Television. An additional 15 episodes were created and released as original video animations (OVAs), bringing the total to 39 episodes. The anime and OVA series were dubbed into English and released in North America by Pioneer Entertainment from 2003 to 2004. Naoki Urasawa and Takashi Nagasaki created a sequel to the series, titled Master Keaton Remaster. Set 20 years after the original series ended, it ran in Big Comic Original from 2012 to 2014 and was collected into a single volume.

As of 2014, Master Keaton had over 20 million copies in circulation, making it one of the best-selling manga series of all time.

Plot
The story revolves around Taichi Hiraga-Keaton, the son of Japanese zoologist Taihei Hiraga and well-born Englishwoman Patricia Keaton.  Keaton's parents separated when he was five, and young Taichi moved back to England with his mother. As an adult, he studied archeology at Oxford University, in part under the tutelage of Professor Yuri Scott. At Oxford, Keaton met and later married his wife, who was a mathematics student at Somerville College. The couple years later divorced, with Keaton leaving his five-year-old daughter Yuriko in her mother's care.  After leaving Oxford, Keaton joined the British Army and became a member of the SAS, holding the post of survival instructor and seeing combat in the Falklands War and as one of the team members that responded to the Iranian Embassy siege.  His combat training serves him in good stead as an insurance investigator for the prestigious Lloyd's of London where he is known for his abilities and his unorthodox methods of investigation. In addition to his work for Lloyd's, Keaton and his friend Daniel O'Connell operate their own insurance investigation agency headquartered in London.  Even though Keaton is extremely successful as an insurance investigator, his dream is to continue his archaeological research into the possible origins of an ancient European civilization in the Danube river basin.

Characters

A British National who works as a freelance insurance investigator in London, and occasionally as a visiting lecturer at universities. However, his dream is to continue his archaeological research into the possible origins of an ancient European civilization in the Danube river basin. Keaton's parents separated when he was five and he grew up in Cornwall with his mother. He studied archeology at Balliol College, Oxford before joining the British Army and becoming a member of the Special Air Service (SAS), where he held the post of survival skills instructor and saw combat in the 1980 Iranian Embassy siege and the 1982 Falklands War.

Keaton's Japanese father who is a zoologist. He occasionally gets involved in his own investigative mysteries. His well-born English wife, Patricia Keaton, seems to have not cared about his womanizing ways, but they are separated. He has a pet Chow Chow–St. Bernard mix, who has an extraordinary sense of smell, even for a dog.

Keaton's 15-year-old daughter. Keaton met Yuriko's Japanese mother when she was studying mathematics at Somerville College, Oxford and they married while still students. The two divorced when Yuriko was five, just like Keaton's parents had done when he was the same age. Although a junior high school student, Yuriko is mature for her age and also has an interest in archeology.

Keaton's business partner at the Keaton & O'Connell Assurance Investigating Office on Baker Street. The two started working together in 1982. In general, Daniel tends to stay at the office, while Keaton does the legwork.

Keaton's childhood friend who looked at him as a love rival over their mutual friend Deborah. Following his childhood dream to be Mike Hammer, he works as a private detective. Charlie's work occasionally sees him cross paths with his childhood rival. Although he tries to prevent Keaton from showing him up on the case, he never succeeds.

Production
There is controversy over who wrote the stories for Master Keaton.  is a pseudonym of manga story writer Hajime Kimura, who was also a co-writer of Golgo 13. Originally, Katsushika created the series' story, while Naoki Urasawa did the artwork. However, after Katsushika died of cancer in December 2004, Urasawa claimed in a May 2005 interview with Shūkan Bunshun that Katsushika eventually stopped work as a story writer due to a personal conflict with him, after which Urasawa alone created both story and art. Because of this, Urasawa demanded that Katsushika's name appear smaller than his on the manga's covers. Manga story writer Kariya Tetsu, who was a close friend of Katsushika and an influential figure at Shogakukan, opposed this action vehemently, which resulted in the discontinuation of the further publication of the manga as of July 2005. In 2019, Urasawa said that he had the ideas for the characters and Master Keaton was very much based on that. He was also going to write the manga in addition to illustrating it, but because he was already writing Yawara!, the editorial team was concerned about a young artist being able to create both. They brought in story writers, but the stories they proposed did not match Urasawa's vision. So instead meetings were held to create stories for the manga. But eventually the editors changed, and these "intimate" meetings were no longer possible. This is when Urasawa took the lead on writing the stories. He said that for the last two volumes, it is fair to say he came up with the stories alone.

Jason Thompson reported that Viz Media considered translating Master Keaton for release in North America in the 1990s, but were "scared off" by the low sales of their release of Urasawa's earlier work, Pineapple Army.

Urasawa and Takashi Nagasaki began the sequel  in 2012. When asked why he went back to a series after so many years, Urasawa stated it was because with the original series he had a hard time making the story he wanted due to contractual obligation, and because people affected by the 2011 Tōhoku earthquake and tsunami said they had enjoyed the series, so he wanted to do something for them.

Media

Manga
Master Keaton was serialized in Big Comic Original from 1988 to 1994. The 144 chapters were collected into 18 tankōbon volumes by Shogakukan between November 1988 and August 1994. A kanzenban edition of the series, including color pages, was published in 12 volumes between August 30, 2011 and June 29, 2012. During its initial magazine run and tankōbon release, Hokusei Katsushika was credited as its writer and Naoki Urasawa as its illustrator. The kanzenban reissue co-credits Katsushika and Takashi Nagasaki as the writers for the first five volumes, while Katsushika and Urasawa are co-credited as the writers from volumes six on. From 1989 to 1993, Katsushika and Urasawa serialized  in special issues of Big Comic Original. The 14 chapters were collected into one tankōbon volume on March 28, 1995, which sees their original two-colored artwork turned into four-colors.

Naoki Urasawa and Takashi Nagasaki created a sequel to the series, titled Master Keaton Remaster. Beginning in the March 19, 2012 issue of Big Comic Original it was published irregularly and finished in 2014. The chapters were collected into a single volume on November 28, 2014, with a deluxe edition including the full color pages from the magazine run released the same day.

In 2014, Viz Media licensed Master Keaton for release in North America. Viz Media published the 12-volume kanzenban edition from December 16, 2014 to September 19, 2017.

Volume list

Anime

An anime adaptation covering a portion of the manga's select chapters aired from October 6, 1998 to March 30, 1999 in Japan on Nippon TV. The series was produced by Madhouse, Nippon Television, Shōgakukan and VAP and directed by Masayuki Kojima, with Tatsuhiko Urahata handling series composition, Kitarō Kōsaka designing the characters and Kuniaki Haishima composing the music. Originally consisting of 24 episodes, an additional 15 episodes were created and released as original video animations from June 21, 1999, to June 21, 2000, bringing the total to 39 episodes. The anime is narrated by Keaton Yamada.

The opening theme "Railtown" is by Kuniaki Haishima. The ending theme for episodes 1–13 is "Eternal Wind" by Blüe,  by Kneuklid Romance for episodes 14–26, and "From Beginning" by Kuniaki Haishima for episodes 27–39. New ending themes were used for the anime's 2007 rebroadcast;  by Kneuklid Romance for episodes 1–13 and "Eber" by Blüe for episodes 14–24.

The anime and OVAs were licensed in North America by Pioneer Entertainment (later named Geneon), with an English dub produced by The Ocean Group. They released eight DVDs from June 10, 2003, to August 10, 2004.

Reception

Manga
As of November 2014, Master Keaton had over 20 million copies in circulation. On TV Asahi's Manga Sōsenkyo 2021 poll, in which 150,000 people voted for their top 100 manga series, Master Keaton ranked #49. Viz Media's release of Master Keaton was nominated in the "Best U.S. Edition of International Material—Asia" category two years in a row at the 2015 and 2016 Eisner Awards. The series was also included on the Young Adult Library Services Association's 2016 list of Great Graphic Novels for Teens.

Mark Sammut of Comic Book Resources praised Master Keaton as an "exhilarating adventure series" that "tackles weighty themes while generally maintaining an accessible tone through its endearing cast of characters and episodic nature." Jason Thompson called it a solid action-adventure series, whose "somewhat old-fashioned structure" reminded him of Golgo 13. Otaku USAs Joseph Luster claimed that with the series, Urasawa, Katsushika and Nagasaki "[weave] a gripping tale of intrigue that bubbles and boils along with the best thrillers out there." He strongly praised Urasawa's art; "Story beats and transitions are confidently executed, and there's just the right amount of exposition peppered in to make it all seem natural." Luster felt that Master Keaton had the potential to appeal to a wider audience than most manga available in English. In a review of the first English volume for Anime News Network, Rebecca Silverman wrote that the premise of the book is fascinating and its stories well-told with the episodic nature of the story and chapters. She described the title character as "a bit like a dorkier Indiana Jones, hiding his badassery under a bad haircut and wrinkled suit" and cited him as a reason to read the series. Silverman speculates that Master Keaton is for mature audience looking for something more serious, as the "motivations of the characters is just as, if not more, important to the plot as the actual events themselves, and even though Urasawa's art is clear and clean, this is not a book you read quickly."

Anime
Hiromi Hasegawa of Ex.org called the anime adaptation's faithfulness to the manga very good; "it has succeeded in capturing the atmosphere of the original and conveying that in a different media. But on the other hand, when watching the show it feels as if I'm reading a manga that moves and talks." They described the episodes, which often take place in Europe, as ranging from murder mysteries to anti-terrorist activities with occasional archaeological/zoological or family interests. Hasegawa noted that each episode has at least one action scene, but explained that these serve as plot devices rather than focal points as the show's plot is "intensely dialogue-oriented." Although Hasegawa praised the art as beautiful and detailed, they had complaints with fluctuations in the animation quality. Hasegawa finished their review by recommending Master Keaton to mature audiences with more sophisticated tastes, and said they learned "quite a bit about political, historical, and ethnic situations in Europe as well as interesting theories in Archaeology or military techniques and weaponry" from the series.

Reviewing the anime for Anime News Network, Zac Bertschy described Master Keaton as a cross between a Tom Clancy novel and Matlock that defies all the conventions of anime and is clearly aimed at older audience. Although calling the stories unique and interesting, he stated that the show never becomes gripping because they teeter "between exciting". Bertschy found the animation to be "competent but nothing special" and the English dub to be "a little on the silly side."

References

External links
Master Keaton at Viz Media
Master Keaton at VAP 

1988 manga
1998 anime television series debuts
2005 anime OVAs
2012 manga
Adventure anime and manga
Geneon USA
Madhouse (company)
Mystery anime and manga
Naoki Urasawa
Nippon TV original programming
Seinen manga
Shogakukan manga
Thriller anime and manga
United Kingdom in fiction
Viz Media manga